Marco Sciaccaluga (21 August 1953 – 10 March 2021) was an Italian actor and theatre director.

Biography
He then worked at the Teatro Aperto alongside , Franco Carli and Antonello Pischedda. In 1975 he directed Equus by Peter Shaffer. He also appeared in four films and two television series.

Marco Sciaccaluga died in Genoa on 10 March 2021 at the age of 67.

Filmography

Cinema
Lapin Lapin (1997)
 (1997)
 (2007)
Terror Take Away (2018)

Television
Vita amori autocensura e morte in scena del signor di Molière nostro contemporaneo ovvero il Tartufo (1976)
 (1976)

References

1953 births
2021 deaths
20th-century Italian male actors
21st-century Italian male actors
Italian theatre directors
Actors from Genoa